The following lists events that happened during 2007 in the Republic of Fiji.

Incumbents
President: Josefa Iloilo (starting January 4) along with Frank Bainimarama 
Prime Minister: Jona Senilagakali (until January 4), Frank Bainimarama (starting January 4)

Events

January
 January 4 - Commodore Frank Bainimarama, who had carried out a military coup on 5 December, restores the deposed President Ratu Josefa Iloilo to office.
 January 4 - President Iloilo appoints Bainimarama as Prime Minister of Fiji.

References

 
Years of the 21st century in Fiji
2000s in Fiji
Fiji
Fiji